The Over-the-Hill Gang is a 1969 American made-for-television Western comedy film about a group of aging  Texas Rangers, starring Walter Brennan and Pat O'Brien. Chill Wills, Edgar Buchanan, Andy Devine, and Jack Elam play supporting roles. The film was written by Richard Carr and directed by Jean Yarbrough.

Description
The plot concerns a young newspaper editor who is conducting a campaign to unseat the town's "tinhorn" mayor. The mayor is backed by a "gun-happy sheriff" and a "whiskey-soaked judge". The editor's campaign receives a boost when he is joined by a former Texas Ranger and "three of the fightin'-est straight shooters around."

The movie premiered on October 7, 1969, as the ABC Movie of the Week. It was one of the first films of that series. It was ABC's top-rated program of the week - the first time that status had been achieved by a film made expressly for television.

A sequel called The Over-the-Hill Gang Rides Again was produced the following year, with Brennan, Wills, Buchanan, Devine, and Burt Mustin reprising their roles, while Fred Astaire replaced O'Brien as the second lead. Both movies doubled as a pilot for a projected weekly TV series, but ABC ultimately passed on the idea.

In 1971, George Allen became the head coach of the Washington Redskins, and he began to acquire many veteran players to bolster the team's depleted roster. In reference to this movie, the Redskins were nicknamed "The Over-the-Hill Gang".

Cast
 Walter Brennan as Nash Crawford
 Pat O'Brien as Captain Oren Hayes
 Chill Wills as Gentleman George Asque
 Edgar Buchanan as Jason Fitch
 Gypsy Rose Lee as Cassie
 Andy Devine as Judge Amos Polk
 Jack Elam as Sheriff Clyde Barnes
 Edward Andrews as Mayor Nard Lundy
 Ricky Nelson as Jeff Rose
 Kristen Nelson as Hannah Rose
 William Smith as Amos
 Myron Healey as Deputy Tucker
 Rex Holman as Deputy Dolby 
 Bruce Glover as Deputy
 Allen Pinson as Deputy Steel
 Burt Mustin as Old Man
 Almira Sessions as Mrs. Fletcher
 Robert Karnes as Sheriff
 Dennis Cross as Sheriff
 William 'Billy' Benedict as Joe (telegrapher)
Harlen Carraher as Nash Crawford's grandson 
Larry Michaels as Nash Crawford's grandson

Remake
The main characters appeared nearly 20 years later in 1988 in writer/director Burt Kennedy's Once Upon a Texas Train, with famous Western stars portraying them. Richard Widmark co-stars as Captain Oren Hayes (replacing Pat O'Brien), Chuck Connors as Nash Crawford (originally Walter Brennan's role), Jack Elam as Jason Fitch (initially portrayed by Edgar Buchanan) and Stuart Whitman as Gentleman George Asque (Chill Wills' part). Elam had the distinction of moving from being one of the bad guys in the original to becoming one of the good guys in the quasiremake, which centers around the former Texas Rangers trying to capture an "over-the-hill" outlaw gang led by Willie Nelson.

References

External links
 
 

ABC Movie of the Week
1969 television films
1969 films
Films produced by Aaron Spelling
Films directed by Jean Yarbrough
Films scored by Hugo Friedhofer
American Western (genre) comedy films
1960s English-language films
1960s Western (genre) comedy films
1960s American films